FK Budućnost Gložan (Serbian Cyrillic: ФК Будућност Гложан, Slovak: FK Budućnost Hložany), or simply Budućnost Gložan, is a football club based in the village of Begeč near Gložan, Serbia. They currently play in the Novi Sad-Syrmia Zone League.

History
The club was founded in 1926.

Supporters
The Budućnost's supporters group as known as Ultras Glozan and Horde zla (not related to the FK Sarajevo's group).

External links
 FK Budućnost Gložan at srbijasport.net

Football clubs in Serbia
Football clubs in Vojvodina
Association football clubs established in 1926
1926 establishments in Serbia
Slovaks of Vojvodina